Salgado River is a river of Alagoas state in eastern Brazil. It flows into the Atlantic Ocean on the border between Japaratinga and Maragogi municipalities.

See also
List of rivers of Alagoas

References
Brazilian Ministry of Transport

Rivers of Alagoas